The Australian Network Information Centre (AUNIC) was the national Internet registry for Australia. It is now disbanded, and its responsibilities undertaken by Asia-Pacific Network Information Centre which serves the entire Asia-Pacific region.

The technical role of .au domain registry is now performed by AusRegistry, overseen by industry regulator auDA.

External links
 aunic.net - official site.

Internet in Australia
National Internet registries